F band may refer to:
 F band (NATO), a radio frequency band from 3 to 4 GHz
 F band (waveguide), a millimetre wave band from 90 to 140 GHz